Banana is a small seaport in the Kongo Central province of the Democratic Republic of the Congo on the Atlantic coast. The port is situated in Banana Creek, an inlet about 1 km wide on the north bank of the Congo River's mouth, separated from the ocean by a spit of land 3 km long and 100 to 400 m wide. The port is located on the creek side of the spit, which shelters it from the ocean. It is about 8 km south-east of Muanda to which it is connected by a paved road running along the coast.

Facilities
The port of Banana consists of one wharf of 75 m and depth 5.18 m, with two small cranes for cargo handling, and a few small jetties. The port has an oil terminal 4 km further upriver, to which tankers discharge while at anchor in the creek. The terminal has a quite separate road access east of Muanda. There are no major facilities in Banana apart from the port, since these are provided by the much larger town of Muanda, where the nearest airport is located. There is no rail link.

There is also a naval base of the Navy of the Democratic Republic of the Congo, which is partly maintained with Chinese assistance.

Climate

History
The town was developed as a port in the 19th century, largely as part of the slave trade. Henry Morton Stanley arrived at Banana in 1879 at the start of an exploratory expedition funded by Leopold II of Belgium. Following the Conference of Berlin (1884–85) the European powers recognised Léopold's claim to the Congo Basin, and  the establishment of the Congo Free State, headed by himself, beginning the period of European colonization.

The Encyclopædia Britannica Eleventh Edition (1911) article on the folkloric belief in werewolves noted that "The people of Banana are said to change themselves by magical means, composed of human embryos and other ingredients, but in their leopard form they may do no hurt to mankind under pain of retaining for ever the beast shape."

Banana was the main Belgian naval base of the Congo until independence in 1960.

Notable people 

 Mahomet Thomas Phillips (1876 - 1943), sculptor and stone mason

See also

 Transport in the Democratic Republic of the Congo

References

External links

Populated places in Kongo Central
Port cities in Africa